The Octopus is a type of amusement ride in the shape of an octopus. Five to eight arms attached to a central axis of rotation and move up and down in a wavelike motion, while cars at the end of the arms, either attached directly to the arm or fixed on spinning crosses, spin freely or stay in place, depending on the exact type of ride. Each Octopus ride has the arms attached the middle of the ride. The middle or centric of the ride will move somehow (Octopus head, Spider cylinder object, and so on). Most octopus rides require guests to be at least 42 inches to ride without an adult; smaller children must have an adult with them. This is a regular at the annual AGS and AHS fairs in Ateneo de Manila University

Different Types of Octopus

There are many different kinds of Octopus. They include:
 Eyerly Octopus — One of the oldest of the Octopus rides, this variant, built by the Eyerly Aircraft Company of Oregon, has eight arms, with one car attached to each arm. As the arms move up and down, the cars can spin freely. The arms, much like the other Eyerly designs, stay in a fixed position, and can not be lowered. This means that the ride must be loaded car by car by the operator, rather than all at once.
 Eyerly Spider — This ride is similar to the Octopus, but with only six arms each of which has two cars on a spinning crossbar.
 Eyerly Monster — Easily the fanciest of the Eyerly designs, this ride has six arms like the spider, but with four cars, rather than two, attached to a spinning cross. 
 Klaus (SDC) Polyp — Originally built in the 1960s by Klaus of Germany, this ride has five arms, with 4 cars attached to a spinning cross at the end of each arm. This variation of the Octopus, though similar to the Eyerly Monster design, differs in two key ways: the cars do not spin since they are attached to the side of the cross arm, and the main arms have the ability to move up and down, rather than staying in a fixed position. This makes the loading and unloading of the ride much quicker and easier. Although the Klaus machines are not extremely common, this design became very popular in Western Europe, with the most common builders of these attractions being Bakker and CAH, both of the Netherlands. 
 Schwarzkopf Monster — This popular variant built by Schwarzkopf of Germany is similar to the Klaus Polyp, but much like Eyerly Monster, the cars are allowed to spin freely on the cross, rather than being attached to the side. The ride has five arms, with either four or five cars attached to each arm. There have been three different models of Monster built by Schwarzkopf (with the most popular being the Monster III), but they all function the same. Sartori of Italy also makes a similar ride.
 Looping/ Suspended Polyp —  Originally designed by Wieland Schwarzkopf (son of Anton Schwarzkopf), the Looping Polyp was similar to the Monster, but featured cars that could flip over as well as spin (similar to a Mondial Shake ride). The cars were also suspended below the crosses, rather than above. The prototype, Sound Factory, built for German showman Kinzler in 1997, was the only Looping Polyp ever built, as the ride was plagued by mechanical issues and was pulled out of service just a couple years later. Around the 2008/2009 season, Gerstlauer of Germany replaced the original looping cars with spinning cars for showman Aigner, who renamed it Parkour and currently tours various German Funfairs.  As of March 2017, Gerstlauer still offers the Suspended Polyp.

Ride locations
 Octopus (Eyerly Octopus) – Hydro Free Fair - Hydro, Oklahoma
 Octopus (Eyerly Octopus) – Funland Amusement Park- Idaho Falls, Idaho
 Monster (Eyerly Monster) – Cedar Point
 Monster (Eyerly Monster) – Kings Island (1972)
 Monster (Eyerly Monster) – Dorney Park & Wildwater Kingdom
 Monstruo (Schwarzkopf Monster III) – Parque de la Ciudad (1983–present), Buenos Aires, Argentina
 Octopus (Vortex) – Riverside County Fair and National Date Festival
 Sea Warrior (Klaus [SDC] Polyp) – Indiana Beach (formerly at Kiddieland and Lake Winnie)
 Spider (Eyerly Spider) – Bill Hames Amusements, carnival
 Spider (Eyerly Spider) – Lakeside Amusement Park
 Spider (Eyerly Spider) – Elitch Gardens
 Spider (Eyerly Spider) – North American Midway Entertainment Co.
 Spider (Eyerly Spider) – Tom Evans United Shows
 Spider (Eyerly Spider) – Evans Midland Empire Shows, Inc.
 Spider (Eyerly Spider) – Idlewild Park
 Spider (Eyerly Spider) – Luna Park, Melbourne
 Spider (Eyerly Spider) – Camden Park
 Octopus (Eyerly Octopus) – Great American Shows.
 Spider (Eyerly Spider) – Waldameer Park
 El pulpo (Eyerly Spider) – Parque Nacional de Diversiones Costa Rica
 Spider (Eyerly Spider) – River City Carnival
 Spider (Eyerly Spider) – South Florida Fair
 The Lobster (Schwarzkopf Monster III) – Six Flags Great America
 Spider (Eyerly Spider) – Conneaut Lake Park
 Spider (Eyerly Spider) – Shooting Star Amusements

See also
 Hurricane (ride)
 Monster (ride)

References

External Videos
 One of the first Schwarzkopf Monster III's
 SDC Polyp

Manufacturer Site

 Sartori Rides
 Emiliana Luna Park srl (ITALY)

Amusement rides
Amusement rides introduced in 1962